Aseri Laing (born 6 May 1975), is a Fijian former professional rugby league footballer who played in the 1990s. He played for the Western Suburbs Magpies from 1993–94 and 1996–98 and then the Melbourne Storm in 1999.

Early life

Born in Mt Albert, New Zealand to Fijian parents, Laing played his junior rugby league with Campbelltown City Kangaroos.

Playing career

Joining Western Suburbs Magpies, playing in under age and reserve grade competitions, before making his first grade debut in 1994. Laing had a year off from rugby league in 1995, resuming his career with Wests in 1996.
In the 1998 NRL season, he made a career-high 20 appearances in first grade.

Leaving Wests after the 1998 season, he joined Melbourne Storm, making a further five first grade appearances, scoring one try.

Laing later represented Fiji in 2006-07.

References

1975 births
Living people
Fiji national rugby league team players
Fijian expatriates in Australia
Fijian people of British descent
Fijian people of I-Taukei Fijian descent
Fijian rugby league players
Melbourne Storm players
Rugby league players from Auckland
Rugby league wingers
Western Suburbs Magpies players